Engebretsen   is a  Norwegian patronymic surname which may refer to:

Geir Engebretsen,  Norwegian jurist and civil servant
Jim Engebretsen, American educator at the Marriott School of Management at Brigham Young University
Kjell Engebretsen, Norwegian politician for the Labour Party
Paul Engebretsen (1910–1979),  American professional football player
Heather Engebretson, American lyric soprano

See also
Ingebretsen

Norwegian-language surnames
Patronymic surnames